Yermolitsa is a rural locality (a village) in Tolshmenskoye Rural Settlement, Totemsky District, Vologda Oblast, Russia. The population was 14 as of 2002.

Geography 
Yermolitsa is located 93 km south of Totma (the district's administrative centre) by road. Uspenye is the nearest rural locality.

References 

Rural localities in Tarnogsky District